Terry Blackwood is a contemporary Christian musician who is best known as lead singer for Christian pop act The Imperials. He was with the group for nearly a decade, joining in 1967 and remaining with them through 1976. At that time, he left the group along with fellow Imperial Sherman Andrus to form Andrus, Blackwood and Company, one of the only racially integrated groups in contemporary Christian music at the time. They recorded 6 albums together between 1977 and 1986.

Biography

Terry Blackwood is the son of Doyle Blackwood, original co-founder of the Blackwood Brothers Qt. Terry's distinctive vocal styling has been featured on many chart topping singles while associated with two highly acclaimed vocal groups, The Imperials and Andrus, Blackwood & Co. You may have seen him as a featured soloist on many Gaither Homecoming videos. 

Terry is currently singing selected dates with the Imperials around the world and here in the US. Their association with Elvis Presley opened many doors for them to sing their gospel songs and they are being received very well. They released a six song sampler entitled "Gospel Ship", available on his website at www.terryblackwood.com
Terry's solo project, "From The Heart", is now available and has taken him, as soloist, into many new churches across the country as he renews old acquaintances and makes new friends. There are now five digitally re-mastered cd's of Andrus, Blackwood & Co. "Soldier Of The Light", "Step Out Of The Night", "ABC Live", "Grand Opening", and "Following You", nominated for a Grammy award in 1978. They are all available at www.terryblackwood.com on the product page. 
 
Terry had a solo cd released in November, 2011 called "Anthology" and that can be found there, as well.

Discography 
From  Christian Music Archive
 Oh What A Savior 1962
 The New Stamps Qt 1963
 What A Day That Will Be 1964
 Introducing the Memphians 1965
 Doyle Blackwood and the Memphians 1966
 New Dimensions (Imperials) 1967
 Imperials Now (Imperials) 1968
 Love Is The Thing (Imperials) 1969
 Gospel Is Alive and Well (Imperials) 1970
 Time To Get It Together (Imperials) 1971
 The Imperials (Imperials) 1972
 Imperials Live (Imperials) 1973
 Follow The Man with the Music (Imperials) 1974
 No Shortage (Imperials) 1975
 Just Because (Imperials) 1976
 Keep Holding On 1976
 Grand Opening 1977
 Following You 1978
 Live 1980
 Soldiers of the Light 1981
 Step Out of the Night 1982
 Holiday 1984
 Best of Andrus, Blackwood and Company 1984
 Hymns and Classics 1993
 Friends IV An Offering 1997
 A Blackwood Homecoming 2000
 Friends IV One Voice 2002
 From The Heart 2003
 The Gospel Side of Elvis (Imperials) 2003
 Gospel Ship 2006
 If My People - The Single 2012
 The Journey 2016
 The Way 2022

External links
 
 

Year of birth missing (living people)
Living people
American performers of Christian music